This is a list of Cypriot Twenty20 International cricketers.

In April 2018, the ICC decided to grant full Twenty20 International (T20I) status to all its members. Therefore, all Twenty20 matches played between Cyprus and other ICC members after 1 January 2021 will have T20I status. Cyprus played their first T20Is in a bilateral series against the Estonia on 5 October 2021, followed by the 2021 Cyprus T20I Cup featuring Estonia and Isle of Man.

This list comprises all members of the Cyprus cricket team who have played at least one T20I match. It is initially arranged in the order in which each player won his first Twenty20 cap. Where more than one player will win his first Twenty20 cap in the same match, those players are listed alphabetically by surname (according to the name format used by Cricinfo).

Key

List of players
Statistics are correct as of 19 July 2022.

References 

Cyprus